Malafemmina is Gianna Nannini's eighth studio album, and tenth album overall. It was released in 1988.

Track listing

"Hey Bionda" (Nannini-I. Campaner/Nannini) – 4:38
"Voglio Fare L'Amore" (Nannini-F. Pianigiani/Nannini) - 4:17
"Time Lover" (Nannini-F. Pianigiani/Nannini) – 3:07
"Un Ragazzo Come Te" (Nannini-F. Pianigiani/Nannini) - 3:49
"Luci Rosse" (Nannini-I. Campaner/Nannini) – 3:51
"Luna Dell'Est" (Nannini-I. Campaner/Nannini) – 4:31
"Aiuto" (Nannini-I. Campaner/Nannini) – 3:54
"Revolution" (Nannini-I. Campaner/Nannini) - 3:48
"Cuore Zingaro" (Nannini-I. Campaner/Nannini) - 4:40
"Casablanca" (Nannini-F. Pianigiani/Nannini) - 4:24
"Donne In Amore" (G. Nannini) - 2:53

Personnel 
Gianna Nannini - Vocals, piano
Marco Colombo - Guitars
David A. Steward - Guitars
Igor Campaner - Keyboards, choir
Rolf Lammers - Organ, keyboards
Nick Davies - Bass, stick
Rüdiger Braune - Drums, percussion
Alan Moulder - Keyboards
Andy Wright - Keyboards, programming
"The Wolperaths" - Choir
Production: Alan Moulder, Gianna Nannini
Executive producer: Peter Zumsteg
Recording engineer: Bruno Gebhard
Mix: Alan Moulder at Trident IL Studios, London (Assistant engineer: Adrian Bushby)
Mix: Logic Studios, Milan (Assistant engineer: Antonio Baglio, Pino Pischetola)
Mastering: Kevin Metcalfe at "The Townhouse", London

Additional information
Cover photography: Peter Ashworth
Artwork: Nino Haslach, Erich Zinsli
Styling: Carla Guido, Giorgio
Recorded Spring 1988 at Conny's Studio, Neunkichen/Cologne, Germany

External links
 Gianna Nannini homepage

1988 albums
Albums produced by Alan Moulder
Gianna Nannini albums
Polydor Records albums